Inape toledana is a species of moth of the family Tortricidae. It is found in Ecuador (Loja Province and Morona Santiago Province).

The ground colour of the forewings is pale brownish, slightly mixed with cream postmedially. The strigulation and suffusions are pale brown. The hindwings are brownish cream, densely spotted with greyish brown.

Etymology
The species name refers to the type locality, Cerro Toledo.

References

Moths described in 2008
Endemic fauna of Ecuador
Moths of South America
toledana
Taxa named by Józef Razowski